Mountains named Cummings Mountain or variations.

United States
In the United States, according to USGS GNIS:

Mountains of California
Mountains of Oxford County, Maine
Mountains of New Hampshire
Mountains of Maine
Mountains of Kern County, California
Mountains of Coös County, New Hampshire